Ferid Radeljaš (born 22 August 1959) is a retired Bosnian-Herzegovinian professional footballer.

Club career
He was a member of the FK Sarajevo squad that won the Yugoslav First League title in 1985, playing alongside club legends Husref Musemić, Faruk Hadžibegić, Davor Jozić, Dragan Jakovljević and Mehmed Janjoš among others. He left Yugoslavia in 1988 to play in the lower leagues there.

Personal life
As of 2018, Radeljaš still lives in Grandvillars with his wife Mevlida and three children.

References 

1959 births
Living people
People from Foča
Bosniaks of Bosnia and Herzegovina
Association football defenders
Yugoslav footballers
FK Sarajevo players
Yugoslav First League players
Yugoslav expatriate footballers
Expatriate footballers in France
Yugoslav expatriate sportspeople in France